The Black Sea Biogeographic Region is a biogeographic region of land bordering the west and south of the Black Sea, as defined by the European Environment Agency .

Extent

The coastline has rocky bays and sea cliffs, but is dominated by long stretches of low sand dunes and beaches sloping into the Black Sea.

Environment

The sea has a moderating effect on the climate, so temperatures do not fall much below  in winter, and are not as high in the summer as in area further inland.
The Kaliakra cliffs in the north of Bulgaria are rich in flora, including many species in common with the neighboring Steppic and Mediterranean Regions.
The western Black Sea Region is the Via Pontica, Europe's second largest bird migration route.
The migrating birds use the coastal lakes, marshes and lagoons behind the shoreline, and some spend the winter in these wetlands.
The Danube Delta is the best known of the wetlands.

In Bulgaria and Romania the region is threatened by development of agriculture, industry, urbanization and tourism.
The Black Sea itself, a very deep inland sea, is poor in oxygen and supports very little marine life in the deeper regions.
However, it had a productive fishery until the 1960s, when stocks crashed in part because of over-fishing and in part from pollution and invasion by exotic species.

Conservation

The first list of Natura 2000 sites in the region was adopted in December 2008. 
This included 40 Sites of Community Importance under the Habitats Directive and 27 Special Protection Areas under the Birds Directive for the part of the Black Sea biogeographical region in the European Union. 
Some sites meet both criteria, so the total was less than 67.
About half the land area was covered by the sites.
As of 12 December 2017 there were 45 Sites of Community Importance.
These were:

Plazh Shkorpilovtsi
Dolinata na reka Batova
Galata
Kamchia
Zlatni pyasatsi
Trite bratya
Kraymorska Dobrudzha
Pobitite kamani
Kamchiyska i Emenska planina
Reka Kamchia
Karaagach
Plazh Gradina - Zlatna ribka
Aytoska planina
Ezero Durankulak
Sredetska reka
Bosna
Derventski vazvishenia 
Fakiyska reka
Zaliv Chengene skele
Atanasovsko ezero
Mandra - Poda
Burgasko ezero
Kompleks Kaliakra
Aheloy - Ravda - Nesebar
Pomorie
Ezero Shabla - Ezerets
Ropotamo
Emine - Irakli
Strandzha
Aladzha banka
Emona
Otmanli
Delta Dunării
Delta Dunării - zona marină
Dunele marine de la Agigea

Mlaștina Hergheliei - Obanul Mare și Peștera Movilei
Pădurea Hagieni - Cotul Văii
Plaja submersă Eforie Nord - Eforie Sud
Vama Veche
Zona marină de la Capul Tuzla
Cap Aurora
Costinesti 
Canionul Viteaz
Lobul sudic al Câmpului de Phyllophora al lui Zernov

Notes

Sources

Environment of Bulgaria
Environment of Romania
Environment of Turkey
Biogeography